The Women's 5 km competition at the 2017 World Championships was held on 19 July 2017.

Results
The final was started at 10:00.

References

Women's 5 km
World